Suomen Robinson 2005, was the second season of the Finnish version of Expedition Robinson, or  Survivor as it is referred to in some countries and premiered 18 September 2005 and concluded 12 December 2005. Immediately upon arriving to the island the contestants were forced to compete in two challenges in order to determine who would be eliminated. The two contestants, Elena Sinkevitch and Mari Jalonen, were both sent to a secret island. As a major twist this season, during the pre-merge portion of the game when a contestant was voted out they would move to a secret island where they would compete against two other contestants to remain in the game. The two contestants left on the secret island following the final duel, Elena Sinkevitch and Markku Markkanen, joined the other members of the merge tribe. The contestants were then divided up into two tribes known as "Goal" and "Texas". When it came time for the final four, the contestants took part in the infamous "plank" competition in which Jasna Preselj was eliminated and Markku Markkanen advanced to the final two. The other two contestants then took part in one more challenge in which Mira Jantunen won and advanced to the final two while Elena Sinkevitch was eliminated. The final two then took part in a duel which Mira Jantunen won and earned an extra jury vote for herself. Along with this, Mira also won the audience's jury vote. Ultimately, it was Mira Jantunen who won this season over Markku Markkanen by a unanimous jury vote of 11-0 to win €40,000.

Finishing order

References

External links
http://www.mesta.net/tv/uutiset/?aid=9957
http://www.mesta.net/tv/uutiset/?aid=10639
http://www.imdb.es/title/tt0815262/fullcredits#cast
http://www.imdb.com/title/tt0368548/fullcredits#cast

Survivor Finland seasons
Finnish reality television series
2005 Finnish television seasons
Television shows filmed in Malaysia